Coleophora acamtopappi is a moth of the family Coleophoridae. It is found in North America, including California.

The larvae feed on the seeds of Acamptopappus sphaerocephalus and Coreopsis species. They create a trivalved, tubular silken case.

References

acamtopappi
Moths described in 1915
Moths of North America